{{DISPLAYTITLE:C23H30O4}}
The molecular formula C23H30O4 (molar mass: 370.48 g/mol, exact mass: 370.2144 u) may refer to:

 Nomegestrol acetate (NOMAC)
 Segesterone acetate (SGA)

Molecular formulas